The Pan American Gymnastics Union organizes Pan American Gymnastics Championships in different disciplines of gymnastics: men's and women's artistic gymnastics, rhythmic gymnastics, acrobatic gymnastics, trampoline and tumbling, as well as aerobic gymnastics. The Pan American Gymnastics Championships are considered by the International Gymnastics Federation to be the official continental championships for the Americas (comprising North America, South America, Central America and the Caribbean). Pan American Championships have also been organized for the sport of aesthetic group gymnastics.

History 
Artistic gymnastics competitions have been contested in the Americas since 1946, at the fifth edition of the Central American and Caribbean Games. In 1951 , the sport was contested at the inaugural edition of the Pan American Games, and in 1957 the first edition of the South American championships in artistic gymnastics was held in Buenos Aires, Argentina. In 1964, the North American Championships in artistic gymnastics was contested for the first time. The meet would be staged until 1968, and in 1969 the competition changed its name to Copa de las Americas (Cup of the Americas) to allow South American nations to compete. At least one South American nation, Brazil, intended to compete, but eventually the event was attended only by North American nations.

Only in 1987, with the development and growth of gymnastics around the world, a tournament for junior gymnasts from the Americas was established with competitions in artistic and rhythmic gymnastics. The event was originally scheduled to take place in 1986, but was ultimately held from February 20 to 28, 1987, in Barquisimeto, Venezuela. It was the first international tournament held on a continental level in the Americas outside of the gymnastics events at the Pan American Games, and the first of its kind for junior gymnasts. A tournament for senior artistic and rhythmic gymnasts took place for the first time in 1989, named the Pan American Cup. A second edition of the tournament was scheduled for four years later, in December 1993, in Maracaibo, Venezuela, with events in men's and women's artistic gymnastics.

In 1997, the title Pan American Cup was dropped in favor of Pan American Gymnastics Championships. The title Pan American Cup would then be used to represent tournaments between clubs, instead of tournaments between national representatives. The 1997 Pan American Gymnastics Championships was held in Medellín, Colombia, and was attended by artistic and rhythmic gymnasts.  In 1995, the International Gymnastics Federation (FIG) recognized aerobic gymnastics (then sport aerobics) as a new competitive gymnastics discipline. The first edition of the Pan American Aerobic Gymnastics Championships was held in Mérida, Venezuela, in 1999. 

The FIG recognized two new gymnastics disciplines, acrobatic gymnastics, as well as trampoline and tumbling, in 1999. In 2004, the Pan American Trampoline and Tumbling Championships was organized for the first time in Tampa, United States. The first edition of the Pan American Acrobatic Gymnastics Championships was organized in 2015. In 2018, parkour was introduced by the FIG as a gymnastics discipline. To date, no Pan American Championships in parkour have been held.

Pan American championships also exist for the sport of aesthetic group gymnastics, a discipline not recognized by the FIG, organized, instead, by the International Federation of Aesthetic Group Gymnastics (IFAGG). The first edition of the tournament was organized in 2017, in Mérida, Mexico.

Senior editions

Acrobatic gymnastics

Aerobic gymnastics

Artistic gymnastics

Rhythmic gymnastics

Trampoline and tumbling

All-time medal table

Artistic gymnastics

Rhythmic gymnastics

Trampoline and tumbling

Best results by event and nation

Artistic gymnastics

Junior editions 
The first edition of the Pan American Championships for youth and junior gymnasts was originally scheduled to take place in Barquisimeto, Venezuela, in 1986, but was ultimately postponed to February 1987.

Artistic gymnastics

Rhythmic gymnastics

Other disciplines

Aesthetic group gymnastics
Senior

See also 
 Gymnastics at the Pan American Games
 South American Gymnastics Championships

References 

 
Gymnastics competitions
International sports championships in the Americas
Recurring sporting events established in 1987
Gymnastics in North America
Gymnastics in South America